Pekata Papa Rao is a 1993 Indian Telugu-language comedy film, produced by Pantangi Pullayah, D.V.V.Ramana Reddy under the Uma Maheswara Movies banner and directed by Y. Nageswara Rao. It stars Rajendra Prasad, Khushbu with music composed by Raj–Koti. The film was recorded as a Hit at the box office.

Plot
The film begins on Papa Rao (Rajendra Prasad), the master of poker which is his livelihood. Once, he gets acquainted with a girl Uma (Kushboo) who flirts him, but he genuinely loves her. Indeed, Uma is a Police officer who is under the hunt of scandalous, deceit several women with espousal. The only clue they hold is the mole on his thigh for which she is scanning everymen. Ultimately, she seizes the culprit Sivaji (Sivaji Raja) and learns that the real malefactor is Meesala Gundaiah (Meesala Bhaskar), a club owner. So, Uma waylays him, before leaving, Gundaiah squares up to take avenge. After some time, Uma & Papa Rao couple up hiding their true identities. Meanwhile, Gundaiah acquits ploys by indicting Papa Rao for the crime of gambling when Uma arrests him. Thereafter, Uma requests Papa Rao to quit gambling then he seeks her to resign. Here, a clash arouses which leads to a bet that Papa Rao should touch Uma for 1 month. Contingent upon, whoever loses must obey the word of the other. After a few comic incidents, Gundaiah defrauds Papa Rao and throws into heavy losses through Sivaji. After realizing the truth, enraged Papa Rao strikes Sivaji and he dies. Soon, Papa Rao understands the falsity of Gundaiah that Sivaji is alive when he ceases him and proves his innocence with the help of Uma. At last, Papa Rao desists gambling and the couple is blessed with a baby boy. Finally, the movie ends the newborn baby picking up playing cards in his naming ceremony.

Cast

Rajendra Prasad as Pekata Papa Rao
Khushbu as Uma
Brahmanandam as Constable Neelakantam
Ali as Abdullah
Tanikella Bharani as Harichandra
Gundu Hanumantha Rao as Gundu
Sivaji Raja as Sivaji
Prasanna Kumar
Ironleg Sastri as Gapathi Sastry
Chidatala Appa Rao as Appa Rao
Kadambari Kiran
Gadiraju Subba Rao as Paalavadu
Jenny as doctor
Haritha as Aadi Lakshmi 
Chandrika as item number
Nirmalamma as Ramanamma

Crew
Art: Raju
Choreography: Siva Subramanyam, Suchitra, John Babu 
Fights: Vicky
Dialogues: Tanikella Bharani
Lyrics: Sirivennela Sitarama Sastry, Jonnavithula, Guduru Viswanatha Sastry
Playback: S. P. Balasubrahmanyam, Chitra, Radhika
Story: M. S. Narayana, Janardan Maharshi
Music: Raj–Koti
Editing: J. Narasimha Rao
Cinematography: V. N. Suresh Kumar
Producer: T. Govinda Reddy, Panthangi Pullayya, DVV Ramana Reddy
Screenplay - Director: Y. Nageswara Rao
Banner: Uma Maheswara Movies
Release Date: 8 September 1993

Soundtrack

Music composed by Raj–Koti. Music released on Supreme Music Company.

Other
 VCDs and DVDs on - VOLGA Videos, Hyderabad

References

Films scored by Raj–Koti
Indian comedy films
1993 comedy films
1993 films
1990s Telugu-language films